Intervention was a yearly Internet culture convention held in Rockville, Maryland. Intervention (a combination of the words "Internet" and "Convention") highlighted independent artists from all spectrums of creative output who use the Internet as their primary distribution method. The convention hosted panels, workshops, movie showings, music concerts, open gaming, and dance events. Later events added a children's track and live musical performances. Following the 2016 event, organizers placed the convention on hiatus and said a plan would be developed for its return, but this was made impossible following the abrupt failure and bankruptcy of its parent corporation, Onezumi Events.

Locations and dates

References

External links
Final archived version of the official website before it was taken offline
Bomb Shelter Radio - Intervention 2010 Presentations and Audio
Charm City Current:  Giving the Internet An INTERVENTION: A Q&A With Onezumi
ComixTalk: Meeting in AA During Intervention Doesn’t Mean What You Think
Washington City Paper: Interview with Onezumi about Intervention
Otaku Generation:  Show #273

Defunct multigenre conventions
Defunct comics conventions
Recurring events established in 2010
Recurring events disestablished in 2016
Internet culture
Conventions in Washington, D.C.